Caparroso is a town and municipality located in the province and autonomous community of Navarre, in the north of Spain.

References

External links
 CAPARROSO in the Bernardo Estornés Lasa - Auñamendi Encyclopedia (Euskomedia Fundazioa) 

Municipalities in Navarre